Timecop is an American science fiction television series. The show was broadcast on the ABC network and first aired in 1997. The series is based on the successful Jean-Claude Van Damme film, Timecop (1994) from Universal Studios, which was in turn inspired by the Dark Horse comic of the same name. Thirteen episodes of the series were ordered, but only nine episodes aired.

The show was broadcast on the ABC network and first aired in 1997, leading off the Monday night lineup at 8 p.m. before Monday Night Football. It did not use any cast from the film and only one character was reused.

Premise 
In 2007, time travel is a reality using time sleds to enter the time stream. However, the technology has leaked beyond the United States government. Rogue time sleds built by other parties are sending criminals into the past for a price. The Time Enforcement Commission was formed to retrieve and arrest the criminals, preventing the alteration of history.

Cast and characters 
 Ted King as Officer Jack Logan
 Cristi Conaway as Officer Claire Hemmings
Hemmings was originally part of the TEC’s science and research division providing support at headquarters. She eventually accompanies Logan in the field on missions. Originally adversarial, she becomes Logan’s romantic interest.
Don Stark as Captain Eugene Matuzek
Matuzek is in charge of the TEC and is the only character carried over from the film the show is based on, although recast with Stark replacing Bruce McGill.
 Kurt Fuller as Dr. Dale Easter
The TEC's chief historian, Easter has a range of historical interests and is a film buff who can cite the major historical events in the year any film was released.

Episodes

Development 
In 1996, the Los Angeles Times reported that ABC ordered a new prime-time series based on the 1994 science-fiction movie Timecop. The pilot was written by series creator Mark Verheiden.

Based on differences in cast, characters, costumes, TEC procedures and technology, episode 5, "Rocket Science," appears to be the original pilot episode and changes were made when the series entered production. Among them:

 Amy Fuller and a young character named Kreutzer are in the historical department whereas Easter is the sole historian appearing in the series. Easter is present as chief historian here but his assistants do the mission research. He also appears to be angry, jaded, unfriendly, cynical and even more sarcastic than the laid-back history nerd of the series. Fuller and Kreutzer are not seen in any other episodes.
 A scene was inserted to try to explain Hemmings' absence wherein Matuzek says Fuller was substituting for Hemmings, but Hemmings' specialty was science and technology, not historical research.
 TEC headquarters is busier, with more personnel and numerous captured time fugitives in period costumes being led through in restraints.
 Matuzek, Easter and other personnel in TEC headquarters were costumed in unconventional business suits suggesting the near future, while in the show, Matuzek reverted to contemporary suits and Easter wore aloha shirts.
 Logan uses a handheld device for data retrieval while on the mission.
 Logan protests being sent on missions, unlike in the rest of the series where he enjoys going on missions.

Cancellation 
Due to low ratings and poor advertising, the series was cut short after less than a season, and only nine out of the thirteen episodes were aired.

Novels
Daniel Parkinson was hired to write an adventure spin-off trilogy based on the series that continues the adventures of Officer Jack Logan. The trilogy consisted of The Scavenger (August 1998), Viper's Spawn (September 1998) and Blood Ties (March 1999). It was published by Del Rey Books.

Availability

On April 1, 2021, all aired episodes except #2 "The Heist" became available to stream for free at TubiTV. For unexplained reasons (possibly music clearance issues with use of The Sylvers' "Boogie Fever"), that episode was skipped, and episodes 3-9 were renumbered as 2-8. Episode #2 can be found on YouTube.

References

External links

1997 American television series debuts
1998 American television series endings
1990s American science fiction television series
1990s American time travel television series
American Broadcasting Company original programming
Television series by Universal Television
Live action television shows based on films
Television series based on adaptations
Timecop (franchise)
American time travel television series
Television series set in 2007
Television shows based on Dark Horse Comics
Television shows set in Washington, D.C.